Nguyễn Công Trứ (阮公著) also Hi Văn (Uy Viễn, Hà Tĩnh 1778–1858) was a Vietnamese poet and scholar.

He came up against a lot of obstacles in academic field in which he was really successful only when he reached the age of 42. Nguyễn Công Trứ held a respectable position in military as a General. Nguyễn Công Trứ was a poet contributing to Vietnamese declamation’s foundation, namely the poem “Bài ca ngất ngưởng”

Nguyễn Công Trứ earned respect as a devoted Confucian scholar and elder statesman. While living in a corrupt feudal system, Nguyễn Công Trứ was known to be honest and straightforward. Nguyễn Công Trứ dedicated nearly all his life to his country and the welfare of its citizens. After his retirement, Nguyễn Công Trứ lived the rest of his life in his hometown and gave a hand with the restoration of pagodas and gave lectures in Buddhism’s belief.
He died 7 December 1858. At Nguyễn Công Trứ’s funeral came King Tự Đức as well as distinguished mourners.

Life
Nguyễn Công Trứ was born into a poor family in Thái Bình. But with diligence, Nguyễn Công Trứ graduated from high school in 1813 and came first in interprovincial Laureate contest in 1819. Then, Nguyễn Công Trứ led a varied life as a mandarin in the Nguyễn dynasty. He held the highest position as Hai An’s Minister and Minister of Defence in 1836 (Quảng Ngãi Province with Hai Duong is Hai An in the past). In 1845, Nguyễn Công Trứ was demoted as a border guard.

When he was an officer in charge of farms (a General takes on agriculture owing to being ordered by the King), Nguyễn Công Trứ broke fresh ground to bring farmers 45.990 acres of enriched rice fields. Kim Son and Tien Hai were the most enriched ones. To give credit for his distinguished civil services, the residents set up Nguyễn Công Trứ’s shrines. One is now in Tien Hai (founded in 1852) and the other is in Kim Son (founded in 1856). The king gave him valuables such as hundreds of ingots of silver, an agate sculpture of horse, a gong bearing a golden inscription “Lao năng khả tưởng” (the meaning: his credits and devotion to duty deserves rewarding).

Because Nguyễn Công Trứ was a righteous, honest and straightforward mandarin, many a dishonest official had an aversion to such individuality of his. Nguyễn Công Trứ was slandered three times, however, luckily enough, everything was brought to light, and he was completely vindicated then. Furthermore, in the event of Kim Son’s and Tien Hai’s bumper crops, the residents invited the 75-year-old mandarin to join the harvest festival as a red-carpet treatment, and dishonest officials vilified him a rebel leader in Kim Son and Tien Hai but then he succeeded in justifying himself to King Tự Đức. Understandably, Nguyễn Công Trứ took the honor and dishonor for granted.

Life as a poet and activist
His poems, which have mostly been written in pictographic script of Vietnamese, show deep feeling. Some findings have shown that Nguyễn Công Trứ had over 1000 poems mainly of Tang prosody and declamation style of Vietnam. The majority of them is now missing. Approximately 150 of his works remain today. What people find remarkable for Nguyễn Công Trứ’s poems is the individualism, which is truly of the freedom and the independence. Nguyễn Công Trứ made contributed to the growth of medieval Vietnamese literature as well as the variation of this language on the grounds that his works are mainly composed in pictographic script of Vietnamese.

The conception of morality in medieval society is “Lap duc- Lap cong- Lap ngon” (Lập đức–Lập công - Lập ngôn), which Nguyễn Công Trứ strove for. “Lap duc”, according to the feudal intelligentsia, is devoting to bring about the country’s prospect and the well-being of its citizens. “Lap cong” bears the meaning of fulfilling the missions assigned by the King. “Lap ngon” is to make a significant contribution to the arts.

Nguyễn Công Trứ led a full and varied life insofar as he was once promoted to the rank of General, but then demoted to the lowest rank as a border guard. Nguyễn Công Trứ experienced many ups and downs in his life and career Furthermore, Nguyễn Công Trứ earned a lot of respect as a devoted Confucian scholar and experienced statesman. Nguyễn Công Trứ dedicated nearly all his life to his country and the welfare of its citizens. After his retirement, Nguyễn Công Trứ lived the rest of his life in his hometown and gave a hand with the restoration of pagodas and gave lectures in Buddhism’s beliefs.

When French colonists invaded Viet Nam in 1858, Nguyễn Công Trứ was one of feudal intellectuals bravely fighting against the enemy’s deployment. Besides, he went unhesitatingly: “Should I be at my last gasp, I will fight tooth and nail for the country’s freedom and independence.” Nguyễn Công Trứ died on 7 December 1858. At Nguyễn Công Trứ’s funeral came King Tự Đức as well as distinguished mourners and The King himself gave the late statesman parallel sentences as an offering “tả hữu nghi văn nghi võ- tử sinh danh tướng, danh thần”. They bear the meaning of complimenting Nguyễn Công Trứ on his great talent for not only literature but also martial arts.

Many poems of Nguyễn Công Trứ’s is on Vietnamese high school curriculum, namely “BÀI CA NGẤT NGƯỞNG” and “NỢ NAM NHI”. Nguyễn Công Trứ High School was named after Nguyen Cong Tru in 1992.

References

1778 births
1858 deaths
People from Hà Tĩnh province
19th-century Vietnamese poets
Vietnamese Confucianists
Vietnamese male poets
19th-century male writers
Nguyễn dynasty poets